The Keram River is a river in northern Papua New Guinea.

See also
List of rivers of Papua New Guinea
Keram languages
Keram Rural LLG

References

Rivers of Papua New Guinea